Byron Daniel Bernstein (May 8, 1989 – July 2, 2020), better known as Reckful, was an American Twitch streamer and professional esports player. He was best known in the gaming community for his achievements in World of Warcraft and Asheron's Call.

Personal life 
Byron Daniel Bernstein was born into a Jewish family to Itamar and Judith Bernstein in Los Angeles. He had two older brothers named Guy and Gary; Guy, the oldest, committed suicide when Bernstein was six. Bernstein said he was a "nerdy kid that no one liked" in elementary school, and was made fun of for his difficulty speaking English, which was his second language. Bernstein said he was a gifted student that was good at math but being made fun of discouraged him from participating in school. When he got into high school, he made friends at school, but said his life revolved around playing a video game, Asheron's Call, which fell out of popularity while World of Warcraft was gaining popularity, and he fell into bouts of depression and attempted to kill himself at 16. He later dropped out of high school, also due to depression. He said that he recognized that video games were a form of escapism for him.

Bernstein said his brother's death had a profound effect on his life and his subsequent struggles with depression. Bernstein was diagnosed with bipolar II disorder as a child. Bernstein said that his family refused to let him try selective serotonin reuptake inhibitors because they believed it led to his brother's death. During a trip to Amsterdam, he tried psilocybin mushrooms, which he said helped him for the first time.

Bernstein died by suicide on July 2, 2020.

Career 
Bernstein was a talented World of Warcraft player, best known for his innovative play style of the "rogue" class, and a pioneer in video game live streaming on Twitch. His popularity in the game began when he finished in the top 0.1% of the competitive ladder without the use of what were considered essential gameplay mechanics at the time. He finished in the top 0.1% of the player base multiple competitive seasons in a row. He competed in a handful of tournaments and won Major League Gaming's World of Warcraft tournament in 2010.

In 2011, Bernstein released the gaming movie Reckful 3. It reached one million views within a week (as of January 2022, the video had over six million views). He later won the WarcraftMovies top-skilled contest, in which players cast their vote for player of the year. In 2012, he became a developer, operations manager and concept designer at Feenix, a gaming mouse company. He created his YouTube channel in October 2012 and followed in November with his first video, Reckful 5 stack Taste for Blood.

In 2017, Bernstein was ranked fourth in The Gazette Reviews list of top-ten richest streamers. He claimed to have a net worth of $1.5 million and was receiving up to 50,000 viewers per stream.

Bernstein played poker and entered the 2016 Unibet Open London main event, but was knocked out early. In November 2017, he played in a charity poker event sponsored by PokerGO. The event was won by itsHafu.

In May 2018, Bernstein began releasing a podcast called Tea Time with Byron, which features long-form interviews with notable guests in the gaming and streaming communities such as Pokimane and Hikaru Nakamura. A total of six episodes were released, the last one on March 31, 2020.

Before his death, Bernstein was in the process of creating an MMO called Everland.

In August 2020, Blizzard and World of Warcraft paid tribute to Bernstein with an in-game trainer, named after his online alias Reckful. The character is placed inside the Cathedral of Light, an in-game landmark where the community gathered to pay Bernstein a tribute following the news of his death.

Twitch streamer Mitch Jones wrote and released a tribute to Bernstein called "Now That You're Gone" in 2021, which chronicles his friendship with Bernstein.

LAN achievements

World of Warcraft 
 3rd Place MLG Dallas 2009
 2nd Place MLG Orlando 2009
 2nd Place MLG Columbus 2010
 1st Place MLG Washington DC 2010

Hearthstone 
 3rd–4th Place 2013 Innkeeper's Invitational

References

External links 
 
 
 

1989 births
2020 deaths
2020 suicides
American esports players
American Jews
American people of Israeli descent
American YouTubers
Gaming YouTubers
Hearthstone players
Twitch (service) streamers
People with bipolar disorder
People from Los Angeles
People from Tel Aviv
Suicides in Texas
World of Warcraft players